National Highway 306 (NH 306) is a  National Highway in the Northeastern Indian states of Assam and Mizoram. NH 306 begins in Silchar, Assam at the intersection of NH 37 and generally runs southward passing through Lumding, Silchar and  Kolasib in  Mizoram. It was earlier known as NH-54.

National Highways Development Project
Approximately  stretch of NH 306 between Kolasib and Silchar has been selected as a part of the East-West Corridor by the National Highways Development Project.

See also
List of National Highways in India (by Highway Number)
National Highways Development Project

References

External links
 NH 306 on OpenStreetMap
 NH 306 on India9

National highways in India
306
306
Transport in Silchar